Haukur Þrastarson (born 14 April 2001) is an Icelandic handball player for Industria Kielce and the Icelandic national team.

He participated at the 2019 World Men's Handball Championship.

Club career
Haukur Þrastarson made his debut for his boyhood club Selfoss in the 2016/2017 season, when he was only 15 years old. After having won the Icelandic Championship with his boyhood club in 2019, Haukur signed with Polish giants Vive Kielce. Shortly after arriving in Poland, Haukur tore his ACL and was ruled out for the season. Despite his injury Haukur was rewarded with a contract extension by Kielce.

International career
Haukur was chosen the Most Valuable Player of the 2018 European Men's U-18 Handball Championship in Croatia when he helped Iceland's U-18 secure silver at the tournament. On 5 April 2018 he made his debut for the Icelandic national team in a 29–31 loss against Norway in a friendly. In 2019 he participated World Men's Handball Championship when he replaced Aron Pálmarsson, who was injured, he played two games against France and Brazil and scored two goals. He was the youngest player of the tournament and became the youngest Icelandic player to participate at a world championship.

References

External links

2001 births
Living people
Haukur Thrastarson
UMF Selfoss handball players
Vive Kielce players